Wangxinzhuang Town is a town located in the western part of Pinggu District, Beijing, China. It shares border with Dahuashan Town and Xiong'erzhai Township to the north, Shandongzhuang Town and Xinggu Subdistrict in the east, Pinggu and Daxingzhuang Towns in the south, and Yukou Town in the west. Its population was 30,586 in 2020. 

This town name was taken from Wangxinzhuang Village, the place where the town's government is hosted.

History

Administrative divisions 
So far in 2021, Wangxinzhuang Town is composed of 23 villages, as listed in the table below:

See also 

 List of township-level divisions of Beijing

References 

Pinggu District
Towns in Beijing